The National Identification Authority is a Government of Ghana agency mandated to officially provide national identity credential to all those living in Ghana. The authority has the power to do so for both Ghanaians and foreigners. The Authority is headquartered in Accra and headed by Ken Attafuah.

References 

Government of Ghana